The Vaippu Sthalam also Called Tevara Vaippu Sthalam are places in South India that were mentioned casually in the songs in Tevaram, hymns composed in praise of the god Shiva during 7th-8th century.

The Paadal Petra Sthalam by comparison are 275 temples that are revered in the verses of Saiva Nayanars in the 6th-9th century CE and are amongst the greatest Shiva temples of the continent.

Thevaram
Thevaram refers to the collection of verses sung on the primary god of the Shaivite sect of Hindu religion, Lord Shiva by three Tamil poets (known as Saiva Kuruvars) - Thirugnana Sambanthar (aka Campantar), Tirunavukkarasar (aka Appar) and Sundaramoorthy Nayanar (aka Sundarar). The former two lived in the 7th century AD while the latter around 8th century AD.  All songs in Tevaram are believed to be in sets of 10 songs (called pathikam in Tamil).

List of Vaippu Sthalam
The list of the Vaippu Sthalam is found in each verse of Tevaram that may be part of verses glorifying other temples (Paadal Petra Sthalam) 

 
 

.

References

Hindu temples in Tamil Nadu
Shiva temples